John Hubert Ware (9 January 1863 – 28 November 1907) was an English first-class cricketer who played for Oxford University in 1886. He was a righthanded batsman who bowled leg breaks. He was born at Ullingswick, Herefordshire and died at Minehead, Somerset.

Ware was educated at Hereford Cathedral School and Brasenose College, Oxford. He became a Church of England priest and was vicar of East Ham, Essex, from 1892 until his death.

References

1863 births
1907 deaths
English cricketers
Oxford University cricketers
People educated at Hereford Cathedral School
Alumni of Brasenose College, Oxford
19th-century English Anglican priests